Arcesilaus IV of Cyrene (flourished 5th century BC) was the eighth King of Cyrene and last king of the Battiad dynasty. He served as a client king under Persian authority.

Biography
Arcesilaus was the only child of the seventh Cyrenaean king, Battus IV. When his father died in 465 BC Arcesilaus became the new king. In 462 BC, Arcesilaus won a chariot race at the Pythian Games at Delphi using native Libyan horses. His victory was celebrated by Greek poet Pindar in the Fourth and Fifth Pythian Odes. Pindar advises Arcesilaus in his ode to reconcile with his opponents and stresses the legitimacy of his rule because his family has ruled in Cyrenaica for eight generations.

His reign grew progressively more tyrannical, exiling many Cyrenaean nobles and bringing in mercenaries to support his rule.  As a result of his actions, the Cyrenaeans rebelled, forcing Arcesilaus to leave Cyrene and flee to Euesperides (modern Benghazi) with his son and only child, Battus V. 

Arcesilaus, along with his son, were killed by the Cyrenaean citizens in 440 BC. It is said that after Battus was killed, the Cyrenaeans cut off his head and threw his head into the sea. With Battus’ beheading, Battiad rule in Cyrenaica ended and the citizens proclaimed Cyrenaica a narrow democracy.

See also
 List of Kings of Cyrene

References

Sources
Herodotus, The Histories, Book 4
Burn, A R. The Penguin History of Greece, Penguin Books, Clay Ltd, St Ives P/C, England, 1990.
Pindar's odes to Arcesilaus
Smith dictionary
https://www.livius.org/ct-cz/cyrenaica/cyrenaica.html
http://www.mediterranees.net/dictionnaires/smith/cyrene.html
https://web.archive.org/web/20070805144946/http://ancientworlds.net/aw/Article/762227
 Hornblower, S. (2011). The Greek World: 479-323 BCE. Routledge. New York.

5th-century BC Greek people
Kings of Cyrene
440 BC deaths
Ancient Pythian athletes
Ancient Greek chariot racers
Year of birth unknown
Rulers in the Achaemenid Empire